A V6 is an engine with six cylinders in two banks of three.

V6 or V-6 may also refer to:

Science and technology
 V.6, a withdrawn ITU-T recommendation for data signalling
 Version 6 Unix, a reference to the sixth edition of Research Unix from 1975
 Dorsomedial area, (Area V6) of the visual cortex
 V6, one of six precordial leads in electrocardiography
 V6 television set-top-box, used by Virgin Media – refer to V+#History

Places
 V6 Grafton Street, a road in Milton Keynes
 Federated States of Micronesia, by ITU prefix

Other
 SSSR-V6 OSOAVIAKhIM, a Soviet airship
 V6 (quickstep), a dance figure in quickstep
 V6 (band), a Japanese musical group
 ATC code V06 General nutrients, a subgroup of the Anatomical Therapeutic Chemical Classification System

See also
 Sony MDR-V6, a large diaphragm foldable headphone
 6V (disambiguation)
 VVVVVV